Frederick Howard Shaw (Federico H. Shaw in Spain) was born in the naval station of Ferrol in northwestern Spain on 20 October 1864. Despite the fact that he was a British subject by birth, most of his life and political career took place in Spain.

His most remarkable political achievements took place during the reign of King Alfonso XIII and Antonio Maura y Montaner's government, when he was given a prominent role in the creation of Spain's social security, the Institute of Provision. In fact, his role was to develop from scratch the entire administrative procedure to be followed by the then newly created institution.

He was also the first administrator of the “Caja General de Pensiones” (General Ministry of Pensions).

He died in Madrid on 11 August 1920.

External links
   Praise to Frederick H. Shaw by D. Álvaro López Nuñez  assistant director of the Spanish Institute of Provision - 1924
    Frederick H. Shaw in The Metal Industry Trade Union of Asturias, Spain official Magazine - 1924 
   Frederick H. Shaw in the official web-site of the “Instituto de Actuarios Españoles”

1864 births
1924 deaths
People from Ferrol, Spain
Conservative Party (UK) politicians
People of the Victorian era
British economists
English people of Irish descent